Dematagoda is in Colombo, Sri Lanka represented by divisional code 9 (Colombo 09). It is surrounded by Borella, Maradana and Kolonnawa. The Baseline Road passes through Dematagoda. The famous Sri Lankan Tamil broadcaster of Radio Ceylon fame, B. H. Abdul Hameed was born in Dematagoda.
The only city in Sri Lanka to have 2 railway stations and the first city to have a flyover.

Schools
 Mukarramah International school
 Anurudhdha Balika Maha Vidyalaya
 JMC College International
 Al-manaar School
 Readway College
 Sivalee Vidyalaya
 St. John's College
 St. Matthew's College
 Veluwana College
 Vipulanantha Tamil Maha Vidyalayam
 Wesley College
 Zahira College, Colombo

Transport
 Dematagoda Railway Station
 Dematagada - Bambalapitiya (Kiribathgoda-Angulana) buses.
The railway signal and telecommunication engineer's office is situated in Dematagoda.

Famous People from Dematagoda
 Dr. Izzerdeen, Medical Doctor
 Naleer Hajiar, Race Horse Owner
 M.N.M Mohideen, Jeweler 
 Irfana Mukthar, Educationist
 Dr. Ramzeen, Abortion Doctor
 M.H.M Towfeek, Social Advisor
 Mufthi Towfeek, Social Worker
 Thanuja Attanayaka, Courts Clark 
 Mohideen Baig, Singer
 Dr. Zeena Razick, Medical Doctor
 Risla Ershad, Jeweler
 Bulgarian Towfeek, Food Importer
 Dr. Rimaza Niyaz, Medical Doctor
 Dr. Suhada Ishak Cader, Medical Doctor

References

Populated places in Western Province, Sri Lanka